Keith William Affleck is an Australian sport shooter, specialising in Fullbore Target Rifle Shooting.

He has competed in the Commonwealth Games, representing Australia at the Belmont Rifle Range in 1982. He won a gold medal in the Fullbore Pairs match with Shooter Geoffrey Ayling winning a gold medal.

References

Living people
Australian male sport shooters
Shooters at the 1982 Commonwealth Games
Commonwealth Games medallists in shooting
Commonwealth Games gold medallists for Australia
Year of birth missing (living people)
20th-century Australian people
Medallists at the 1982 Commonwealth Games